The Embassy of Canada in Afghanistan (Persian: سفارت کانادا در کابل) was the diplomatic mission of the Canadian government located in the Afghan capital city of Kabul. It was responsible for bilateral relations between Canada and Afghanistan. Diplomatic relations between the two countries were re-established on September 5, 2003. The relations were suspended in light of the fall of Kabul, and the taliban take over. The most recent Ambassador was Reid Sirrs.

History
On 20 June 2016, guards at the embassy were attacked by a suicide bomber belonging to either the Taliban or the Islamic State of Iraq and the Levant. At least 14 to 16 people were killed, not including the suicide bomber. Nine people were injured.

Closure
As the 2021 withdrawal of American forces from Afghanistan led to a powerful Taliban offensive, Canada deployed special forces to evacuate the staff inside, and closed the embassy later in August 2021.

See also
 Afghanistan–Canada relations
 Canada in the War in Afghanistan

References

External links
 Official site

2003 establishments in Afghanistan
Canada
Afghanistan
Afghanistan–Canada relations